CEFCU Arena, formerly known as Redbird Arena, is a 10,200-seat multi-purpose arena located in Normal, Illinois, on the campus of Illinois State University. Built in 1989, the building is notable for its use of a Teflon-coated roof that gives off a "glow" during night events. Three Illinois State Redbirds athletic teams use the facility as their home court: men's basketball, women's basketball, and women's volleyball.

The arena was renamed CEFCU Arena after the school and CEFCU agreed to a 10-year naming rights deal.

Sports
Illinois State is one of just 10 college volleyball programs to draw more than 250,000 fans in the last decade.

Students who enjoy men's basketball and sit in the student section often paint their faces red and wear red T-shirts and become part of "Red Alert", the official student spirit group of Illinois State athletics.

Amenities
CEFCU Arena boasts new scoreboards installed during the 2006-2007 basketball season.  The center-hung scoreboard has four-sided HD video boards.  They were initiated at the Bradley game when the court was named after ISU great Doug Collins.  For the 2011-2012 basketball season an HD video board between opposing benches courtside was installed.  It was funded and named after sponsor Frontier Communications Company, that also provided new black leather chairs for players and coaches.

Miscellaneous
CEFCU Arena has hosted a variety of Illinois High School Association events. It has been the home of the girls' volleyball tournament since 1990 and the girls' basketball tournament since 1992. It has also hosted the dual team portion of the state wrestling tournament and in 2006 hosted the inaugural state competitive cheerleading meet.

See also
 List of NCAA Division I basketball arenas

References

External links
 Redbird Arena (RBA)

College basketball venues in the United States
College volleyball venues in the United States
Illinois State Redbirds men's basketball
Illinois State Redbirds women's basketball
Basketball venues in Illinois
Volleyball venues in Illinois
Wrestling venues in Illinois
Sports venues in Bloomington–Normal
Sports venues completed in 1989
1989 establishments in Illinois